Yongcheol Shin (born 24 December 1960) is a South Korean-born British economist at the University of York. He has previously held positions at leading academic institutions such as University of Cambridge, University of Edinburgh and University of Leeds. His notable contributions to econometrics include asymmetric autoregressive distributed lag model, unit root tests in ESTAR framework, and the long-run structural VAR modelling approach.

Education and career
Yongcheol Shin received his bachelor's degree in English Literature in 1983 and Master's in Economics at the Hankuk University of Foreign Studies, South Korea in 1985. He received his PhD in economics from Michigan State University in 1992. Currently, Shin is a professor at the Department of Economics and Related Studies at the University of York. Before he has worked as professor at the Department of Economics at the Leeds University Business School (University of Leeds) for seven years.

Previously, he has worked as Senior Research Officer from 1995 to 1998 and Research Officer at the Department of Applied Economics, University of Cambridge. In 1995–1996, Shin served as short term consultant at the International Economics Department of the World Bank and at the Citibank International plc. London. He was a visiting professor at the SungKunKwan University, Seoul, and Wits University, Johannesburg. From 1995 to 1997, he worked on the econometric software project, Working with Microfit, at the Cambridge University as hands-on session supervisions.

Shin has served as reader from 2000 to 2004 and a lecturer at the University of Edinburgh School of Economics from 1998 to 2000. He was a professor at the Economics Division at the University of Leeds from 2004 to 2011.

Academic merits
Shin has published and written more than 46 articles in leading scientific journals in the areas of econometrics, macroeconomics, asset pricing and empirical finance. His contribution to the ARDL model for the cointegration analysis with Mohammad Hashem Pesaran was introduced in the Cambridge University book, "Econometrics and Economic Theory in the 20th Century" (Ed. Steinar Strøm).

He was awarded Best Paper Award 2002–2004 by Econometric Reviews with Pesaran in 2005 for their research paper Long Run Structural Modelling.

Publications
 Greenwood-Nimmo, M.J.; Shin, Y.; and Van Treeck, T., The Asymmetric ARDL Model with Multiple Unknown Threshold Decompositions: An Application to the Phillips Curve in Canada. Working Paper Series, The Leeds University Business School, 2011
 Serlenga, L.; Shin, Y., Gravity models of intra-EU trade: application of the CCEP-HT estimation in heterogeneous panels with unobserved common time-specific factors, Journal of Applied Econometrics, 22 (2), pp361–381, 2007
 Shin, Y; Snell, A, Mean group tests for stationarity in heterogeneous panels, Econometrics Journal,  9(1), pp123–158,  2006
 Shin, Y; Snell, A, Mean Group Tests for Stationarity in Heterogeneous Panels The Econometrics Journal,  2006
 Shin, Y; Kapetanios, G; Snell, A, Testing for Cointegration in Nonlinear Smooth Transition Error Correction Models Econometric Theory,  22, pp79–303,  2006
 Garratt, A; Lee, K; Pesaran, MH; Shin, Y, A Long Run Structural Macroeconometric Model of the UK Economic Journal,  113(4), pp412–455,  2003
 Garratt, A; Lee, K; Pesaran, MH; Shin, Y, Forecast Uncertainties in Macroeconomic Modeling: An Application to the UK Economy Journal of the American Statistical Association,  98(464), pp829–838,  2003
 Im, KS; Pesaran, MH; Shin, Y, Testing for unit roots in heterogeneous panels Journal of Econometrics,  115(1), pp53–74,  2003
 Pesaran, MH; Shin, Y, Long-Run Structural Modelling Econometric Reviews, pp49–87,  2002
 Chortareas, G; Kapetanios, G; Shin, Y, Nonlinear Mean-reversion in Real Exchange Rates Economics Letters, pp411–417,  2002
 Kapetanios, G; Shin, Y; Snell, S, Testing for a unit root in the nonlinear STAR framework Journal of Econometrics,  112(2), pp359–379,  2002
 Serlenga, L.; Shin, Y.; and Snell, A., A Panel Data Approach to Testing Anomaly Effects in Factor Pricing Models. Royal Economic Society Annual Conference 2002 165, Royal Economic Society.
 Pesaran, MH; Shin, Y; Smith, RJ, Bounds testing approaches to the analysis of level relationships Journal of Applied Econometrics,  16(3), pp289–326,  2001

See also
 KPSS test

References

Academics of the University of Leeds
Academics of the University of Cambridge
Academics of the University of Edinburgh
1960 births
Living people
British people of Korean descent
South Korean economists
South Korean emigrants to the United Kingdom
British economists
Michigan State University alumni